The Belarus women's national under-16 and under-17 basketball team is the national women's basketball team that represented Belarus in international under-16 and under-17 tournaments. The national team is administered by the Belarusian Basketball Federation.

After the 2022 Russian invasion of Ukraine, the FIBA suspended Belarus from participating in basketball and 3x3 basketball competitions.

FIBA U16 Women's European Championship participations

FIBA Under-17 Women's Basketball World Cup participations

See also
Belarus women's national basketball team
Belarus women's national under-18 basketball team
Belarus men's national under-16 basketball team

References

External links
Archived records of Belarus team participations

Basketball in Belarus
Basketball
Women's national under-16 basketball teams